Kėdainiai is one of the oldest cities in Lithuania. First mentioned in the 1372 Livonian Chronicle of Hermann de Wartberge, its population  is 23,667. Its old town dates to the 17th century.

The city is the administrative centre of the Kėdainiai District Municipality. The geographical centre of the Lithuanian Republic is in the nearby village of Ruoščiai, located in the eldership of Dotnuva.

Names
The city has been known by other names: Kiejdany in Polish, Keidan (קיידאן) in Yiddish, and Kedahnen in German. Kėdainiai other alternate forms include Kidan, Kaidan, Keidany, Keydan, Kiedamjzeÿ  ("j" /e/), Kuidany, and Kidainiai.

History

The area was the site of several battles during "The Deluge", the 17th century war between the Polish–Lithuanian Commonwealth and Sweden. In 1655 a short-lived treaty with Sweden, the Union of Kėdainiai, was signed by two members of Radziwiłł family in their Kėdainiai castle. While little remains of the Radziwiłł castle, the crypt of the Calvinist church (1631) houses the family mausoleum, including the tombs of Krzysztof Radziwiłł and his son Janusz.

Scottish Protestants arrived in the late 16th and 17th centuries, encouraged by the conversion of Anna Radziwill; the community exerted considerable influence in the city and persisted until the mid-19th century. The grouping of the buildings around the town square still include the imposing homes of merchants known as the "Scottish Houses". These include; the George Anderson House, the John Arnot House, the George Bennet House, the James Gray House, the Steel Property, and the surviving basement of the Alexander Gordon house.

A local custom called on all visitors to bring a stone to be used in the town's construction.

World War II

During Operation Barbarossa, Kėdainiai was occupied by the German Army in the summer of 1941. On August 28, 1941, the entire Jewish community of Kėdainiai, a community which had inhabited the area for 500 years, were killed under the direction of German Special Police Battalions, with the aid of the local Lithuanian population. The Jewish population prior to the Holocaust was 3000.

Soviet period

During the Cold War it was home to Kėdainiai air base, a major Soviet military airlift facility.

For many years, Kėdainiai was known for its chemical and food processing industries. The Kėdainiai chemical plant, Lifosa began operations in January 1963. Publicized as a milestone in the industrialization of Lithuania, it emitted significant quantities of sulfuric acid and was the subject of ecological protests in the 1980s.

Independent Lithuania
Following years of stagnation, old enterprises have come back to life, and new ones have been established, contributing to its status as an economic stronghold.

Demographics

Transportation
Kėdainiai is accessed by Via Baltica highway from Kaunas and Panevėžys, and by rail from Vilnius, Klaipėda and Šiauliai. It is also served by Kaunas International Airport, the second largest airport in Lithuania, located in Karmėlava site.

Cultural activities

The Kėdainiai Regional Museum, established in 1922, now operates four branches: a Multicultural Centre, the Mausoleum of the Dukes Radziwill, the House of Juozas Paukštelis, and the Museum of Wooden Sculptures of V.Ulevičius.

Since the city is known as the cucumber capital of Lithuania, it sponsors an annual cucumber festival.

In 2013, the band Bastille shot a music video for their single "Things We Lost in the Fire" in the location.

A small Polish minority of 329 (0,61%) people live in Kėdainiai district municipality, but only 30 people participate in Stowarzyszenie Polaków Kiejdan (The Kėdainiai Polish Association), the elder people; their cultural activities involve public celebrations of Polish Day of Independence and Day of the Constitution of Third of May, as well as organizing a festival of Polish culture. Since 1994 a School of Polish Language exists.

Education
 Jonušas Radvila College (Kėdainių Jonušo Radvilos studijų centras)
 Kėdainiai Atžalynas gymnasium
 Kėdainiai Šviesioji gymnasium

Sport
Basketball club BC Nevėžis, which participate in Lithuanian basketball league. Football club FK Nevėžis, named after the nearby river plays in second-tier league I Lyga. Other football teams include FK Lifosa and FK Nevėžis-2, the reserve team of Nevėžis.

Mayors of Kėdainiai

Notable citizens

 Jonušas Radvila (1612–1655) - Lithuanian nobleman, magnate
 Antanas Mackevičius, a priest and a leader of the 1863 uprising
 Czesław Miłosz, Polish writer, Nobel Prize winner. Born in Šeteniai village
 Mikalojus Daukša, Lithuanian writer, translator
 Martin (Moshe) Kagan, a leader of the anti-Nazi resistance group HaShomer HaTzair
 Ezekiel Katzenellenbogen, rabbi and prolific author
 Avrohom Eliyahu Kaplan (1890-1924), prominent Orthodox rabbi.
 Moshe Leib Lilienblum, Jewish scholar and author
 Viktoras Muntianas, Lithuanian politician, former Speaker of the Seimas
 Juozas Paukštelis, author
 Juozas Urbšys, Lithuanian diplomat. Born in Šeteniai village
 Shlomo Zalman Zoref, re-established the Ashkenazi community in the Old City of Jerusalem in 1811
Bernard G Richards (b. March 9, 1877 Dov-Gershon Rabinovich in Keidan, Lithuania - d. 25 June 1971 in the US) author and Jewish leader.

Twin towns – sister cities

Kėdainiai is twinned with:

 Brodnica, Poland
 Fălticeni, Romania
 Kohtla-Järve, Estonia
 Łobez, Poland
 Melitopol, Ukraine
 Sömmerda, Germany
 Svalöv, Sweden
 Telavi, Georgia

The city was previously twinned with:
 Rostov, Russia
 Vawkavysk, Belarus
 Zelenogradsk, Russia

Gallery

See also
 Kėdainiai railway station

References
 
 kedainiai.lt
 History of Kėdainiai
 - Kėdainiai tourist and business information center
 Article on Kedainiai's Jewish community
 JRK Center College of Janusz Radziwiłł

Notes

 
Cities in Kaunas County
Cities in Lithuania
Municipalities administrative centres of Lithuania
Kovensky Uyezd
Holocaust locations in Lithuania